Mohammed Aman Fateh Khairalah (born 14 April 1997) is a Yemeni professional footballer who plays as a goalkeeper for Yemeni club Al-Shaab Hadramaut and Yemen national team.

References

External links 

 Mohammed Aman at Soccerway

Living people

Yemeni footballers

Yemeni League players

Association football goalkeepers

1997 births